Radoslav Sloboda is a Slovak professional ice hockey player who played with HC Slovan Bratislava in the Slovak Extraliga.

References

Living people
HC Slovan Bratislava players
Year of birth missing (living people)
Slovak ice hockey players